Dugdale is a last name.

Dugdale may also refer to:
The Dugdale Centre, an arts centre in London, UK
Dugdale Field, a defunct stadium in Seattle, Washington, United States
Dugdale Glacier, Antarctica
Dugdale, Minnesota, an unincorporated community in Polk County, Minnesota, United States
PS Thomas Dugdale, British paddle steamer passenger vessel
Dugdale Society, English text publication society